St. John's Northwestern Military Academy (SJNMA) was founded in 1884 as St. John's Military Academy (SJMA) in Delafield, Wisconsin, by the Rev. Sidney T. Smythe as a private, college preparatory school. In 1995, Northwestern Military and Naval Academy (NMNA) in Lake Geneva, Wisconsin, merged with St. John's Military Academy to become St. John's Northwestern Military Academy on the Delafield campus. And, in 2020, a Leadership Academy was added and we became St. John's Northwestern Academies. SJNA (St. John's Northwestern Academies) is a coed independent boarding and day school for boys and girls in grades 6–12. St. John's Northwestern Summer Academy offers Little Lancers Day Camp, Summer Academy Plus, and ESL courses.

Historic buildings
St. John's Northwestern campus consists of a collection of historic buildings, many with towers and battlements in a style that suggests a Medieval castle, with most of them arranged in a U around the drill field.
 The school's oldest surviving building is the 1857 rectory of St. John Chrysostom Church, a small Picturesque-style house which was repurposed in 1884 as the academy's first dormitory, infirmary and dining hall.
 Next is the odd Shingle style Memorial Hall, designed by John A. Moller with its two caps and built in 1893 as a recreational building/gymnasium.
 Next among the surviving buildings is the Dr. Sidney Thomas Smythe house, designed by John A. Moller and built in 1901, an unusual agglomeration of Shingle style (the massing) and Classical Revival (the Doric columns) styles. Smythe, the founder of the school, lived here, calling the house "Rosslyn."
 Knight Hall classroom building was added in 1902.

 Next was DeKoven Hall, designed in Collegiate Gothic style by Thomas Van Alyea and built in 1906, a four-story barracks/administration building with octagonal towers at the corners and battlements topping the walls.
 The dining hall and barracks Welles Hall was also added in 1906, designed by Van Alyea in a style similar to DeKoven Hall, but with a large square clock tower.
 The Beacon is a fieldstone monument built in 1923. It holds an eternal light and displays quotes from St. John's founder.
 Victory Memorial Chapel was built from 1921 to 1926, modeled by Van Alyea on the chapel at West Point, and clad in lannonstone.
 In 1927 the school added the two-story Hazelwood Hall designed by Van Alyea, housing barracks and classrooms, and it was expanded with Scott Johnston Hall in 1930, with a corner turret.
 Smythe Hall was added in 1929, a classroom designed by Van Alyea in a "castle" style like the previous buildings.
In 1977 these historic campus buildings were listed on the National Register of Historic Places for the complementary design of many of them and since the school is the oldest military academy in Wisconsin.

Notable alumni
 Ehab Amin, Egyptian basketball player
 Harold Huntley Bassett, United States Air Force major general
 Ralph Barnes, American journalist
 Ed Bearss, Civil War historian, tour guide, and United States Marine Corps veteran
 Roman R. Blenski, Wisconsin state politician
 Eliot Bostar, member of the Nebraska Legislature
 Martin Breunig, German basketball player
 Donald Clough Cameron, American writer of detective novels and comic books
 Jack Carson, American actor in the 1940s and 1950s
 Theodore Case, chemist, physicist, inventor of the Movietone sound system
 Ahmad Caver, American basketball player who played for the Memphis Hustle
 John M. Cavey, Wisconsin state politician
 Tom T. Chamales (SJMA, 1942), writer and veteran of U.S. Army's Merrill's Marauders
 Edward A. Craig (SJMA 1917), U.S. Marine Corps officer who commanded combat units during World War II and the Korean War.
 Darroll DeLaPorte, American football player in the Milwaukee Badgers
 Donald Freed, American playwright, novelist, teacher and activist
 Daniel Gerber (SJMA 1916), founder and president of Gerber Baby Foods.
 Nick Gravenites (did not graduate), blues, rock and folk singer for Electric Flag
 John A. Hazelwood, Wisconsin state politician
 Reggie Hayes, American actor, screenwriter and director
Trévon Hughes (2006), basketball player in the Israeli National League
 George Kennan (SJMA 1922), U.S. Ambassador to the USSR (1952) and Yugoslavia. He helped develop the Marshall Plan for reconstruction of Europe after World War II.
 Monte Merkel, American football player for the Chicago Bears
 Frank Merrill (SJMA 1967), American equestrian
 Sankar Montoute, American football player for the Tampa Bay Buccaneers.
 Alex Moyer, American football player for the Miami Dolphins
 Thomas Cebern Musgrave Jr., United States Air Force major general
 Adam Rapp, novelist, playwright, musician and film director
 Frank C. Rathje (SJMA, did not graduate, honorary 1959), Chicago banker and lawyer
 Jack Riley, American football player for the Boston Redskins
 Curtis Roosevelt (NMNA 1948), the eldest grandson of President Franklin D. Roosevelt, was a statesman who served as a delegate representing the United States to the United Nations.
 Daniel Rostenkowski (SJMA 1946), Illinois Democratic leader in the U.S. House of Representatives.
 Tony Schumacher, award-winning drag racer
 Jayapataka Swami (Gordon John Erdman II, SJMA 1965), Hare Krishna guru.
 Martín Torrijos (SJMA 1981), President of Panama.
 Spencer Tracy (NMNA 1919–1920, non-graduate), two-time Academy Award–winning actor.
 Ty Warner (SJMA 1962), CEO and founder of Ty Inc., manufacturer of Beanie Babies.
 Minor Watson, character actor known for films in the 1940s
 Harold J. Week, Wisconsin state politician
 Ronnie Williams, American basketball player
 George Wilson (SJMA 1933), NFL end with the Chicago Bears (1937–46). He later coached the Detroit Lions to the NFL Championship Game, 1957 NFL Championship before becoming the first coach of the Miami Dolphins.
 Harry Wismer, sports broadcaster and the charter owner of the New York Titans (now the New York Jets).
 Cornelius T. Young, Wisconsin state politician
 Tony Zielinski (SJMA 1979), politician in Milwaukee, Wisconsin

Notes

External links

 

Private high schools in Wisconsin
Educational institutions established in 1884
Educational institutions disestablished in 1995
Military high schools in the United States
Schools in Waukesha County, Wisconsin
Private middle schools in Wisconsin
Preparatory schools in Wisconsin
1884 establishments in Wisconsin